K. K. Raja (28 March 1893 – 6 April 1968) was a Malayalam poet from Kerala, India. He received the Kerala Sahitya Akademi Award in 1960 for the collection Malanatil.

Biography
K. K. Raja was born as Kunju in 1893 at Kumarapuram kovilakam (part of the Thalappilli Swaroopam of Kingdom of Cochin ) which is situated in Eravimangalam village, Nadathara. His father Meledath Nambothan Nambudiri was a Sanskrit scholar. After the death of his mother Kunjukkutti Thamburatti, young Kunju was well taken care of by his grandmother. He completed his school education in Trichur and Kunnamkulam. He started writing poems at a young age and the child's writing skills were encouraged by family friend and famous poet Kunhikuttan Thampuran. His first poem "Khshanika Vairagyam" was published in Kavana Kaumudi magazine. After passing successfully the Vidwan test, Raja worked as a teacher in Ernakulam Government Girls' High School and Irinjalakkuda Government High School. Raja became a full-time writer by this period and wandered all over India before joining St. Thomas School, Trichur.

Major works
 Malanattil (മലനാട്ടിൽ)
 Kavanakusumanjali (കവനകുസുമാഞ്ജലി)
 Tulsidaamam (തുളസീദാമം)
 Vellithoni (വെള്ളിത്തോണി)
 Bashpanjali (ബാഷ്പാഞ്ജലി)
 Harshanjali (ഹർഷാഞ്ജലി)

References

1893 births
1968 deaths
Malayali people
Writers from Kochi
Poets from Kerala
Malayalam-language writers
Malayalam poets
Recipients of the Kerala Sahitya Akademi Award
20th-century Indian poets
Indian male poets
20th-century Indian male writers